Monosnap is a screenshot program for Mac OS X and Windows. The program allows users to create screenshots, annotate them and upload them to the cloud. It was released for Mac OS X on 11 July 2012. Several days after it was positively reviewed by sites like Addictive Tips, freetech4teachers, OneDayOneApp and MakeUseOf, an update was released on 5 August 2012, providing authorization with email. On 10 August there was a release for Windows, providing similar functionality.

Since 9 October 2012 (version 1.4.0) app allows to upload images to FTP, SFTP or WebDAV servers. Right now it also has in-app turning on external services support (Dropbox, Evernote, Box.com, CloudApp).

Features

Screenshots 
Monosnap has two modes of screenshot: the first one grabs the whole screen (or screens). The second mode grabs an area or window of the screen. In the latter mode a magnifier is presented, showing size of the selected rectangle and color of pixel below cursor.

Image editor
After taking a screenshot, Monosnap opens its Editor with tools such as a pen, line, rectangle, oval, arrow, text and blur. Also it has a crop tool to remove unnecessary details if that has not been done while capturing a screen.

After screenshot
There are several options to proceed with screenshot, available from settings:
Open Monosnap Editor – selected by default
Save screenshot – saves the image to default folder or opens a dialogue
Upload – instantly uploads to the cloud or to FTP/SFTP/WebDAV server.
Open external Editor – opens the image in any installed program capable to work with png format. This option is available only on Mac.
"Drag me" feature: from Monosnap Editor images can be dragged into other programs.

Cloud storage
Using cloud storage requires login with Facebook or email. All uploads can be accessed through website, images can be sorted into folders. There is no limit of cloud space now.

However, there seems to be a limit on the traffic generated by accessing your uploads, and subsequently the user may be banned.

References

External links
 
 

Screenshot software
Utilities for macOS
Utilities for Windows